A Modern Dubarry (German: Eine Dubarry von heute) is a 1927 German silent drama film directed by Alexander Korda and starring María Corda, Alfred Abel and Friedrich Kayßler. A young woman working at a dressmakers rises to become a model and entertainer before falling in love with a King.

The title is a reference to the life of the eighteenth century courtesan Madame Du Barry. It was made by Felsom Film and distributed by the major studio UFA. The film's sets were designed by the art director Oscar Friedrich Werndorff. It features performances from Hans Albers and Marlene Dietrich both of whom later achieved greater fame.

Cast
María Corda as Toinette  
Alfred Abel as Sillon 
Friedrich Kayßler as Cornelius Corbett  
Gyula Szőreghy as Gen. Padilla  
Jean Bradin as King Sandor  
Hans Albers as Toinette's first lover  
Alfred Gerasch as Graf Rabbatz  
Albert Paulig as Clairet  
Hans Wassmann as Theater Director  
Karl Platen as Diener  
Eugen Burg as Levaseur  
Marlene Dietrich as Kokotte  
Hilde Radney as Juliette 
Julia Serda as Tante Julie  
Hedwig Wangel as Rosalie  
Lotte Lorring as Mannequin

References

External links

Films of the Weimar Republic
Films directed by Alexander Korda
German silent feature films
UFA GmbH films
1927 drama films
German drama films
German black-and-white films
Silent drama films
1920s German films